A hypercarnivore is an animal which has a diet that is more than 70% meat, either via active predation or by scavenging. The remaining non-meat diet may consist of non-animal foods such as fungi, fruits or other plant material. Some extant examples of hypercarnivorous animals include crocodilians, owls, shrikes, eagles, vultures, felids, most wild canids, dolphins, snakes, spiders, scorpions, mantises, marlins, groupers, piranhas and most sharks. Every species in the family Felidae, including the domesticated cat, is a hypercarnivore in its natural state. Additionally, this term is also used in paleobiology to describe taxa of animals which have an increased slicing component of their dentition relative to the grinding component. Hypercarnivores need not be apex predators. For example, salmon are exclusively carnivorous, yet they are prey at all stages of life for a variety of organisms.

Many prehistoric mammals of the clade Carnivoramorpha (Carnivora and Miacoidea without Creodonta), along with the early order Creodonta, and some mammals of the even earlier order Cimolesta, were hypercarnivores. The earliest carnivorous mammal is considered to be Cimolestes, which existed during the Late Cretaceous and early Paleogene periods in North America about 66 million years ago. Theropod dinosaurs such as Tyrannosaurus rex that existed during the late Cretaceous, although not mammals, were obligate carnivores.

Large hypercarnivores evolved frequently in the fossil record, often in response to an ecological opportunity afforded by the decline or extinction of previously dominant hypercarnivorous taxa. While the evolution of large size and carnivory may be favored at the individual level, it can lead to a macroevolutionary decline, wherein such extreme dietary specialization results in reduced population densities and a greater vulnerability for extinction. As a result of these opposing forces, the fossil record of carnivores is dominated by successive clades of hypercarnivores that diversify and decline, only to be replaced by new hypercarnivorous clades.

As an example of related species with differing diets, even though they diverged only 150,000 years ago, the polar bear is the most highly carnivorous bear (more than 90% of its diet is meat) while the grizzly bear is one of the least carnivorous in many locales, with less than 10% of its diet being meat.

See also
 Hypocarnivore
 List of feeding behaviours
 Mesocarnivore

References

External links 

Carnivory